The 2014 Copa Verde Finals was the final two-legged tie that decided the 2014 Copa Verde, the 1st season of the Copa Verde, Brazil's regional cup football tournament organised by the Brazilian Football Confederation.

The finals were contested in a two-legged home-and-away format between Paysandu, from Pará, and Brasília, from Distrito Federal.

Paysandu won the first leg 2–1, and Brasília won the second leg by the same score, which meant the title was decided by a penalty shoot-out, which Brasília won 7–6 to claim their first Copa Verde title. However, on 28 July 2014, the title was awarded to Paysandu, due to irregularities of the squad of Brasília. Brasília appealed against this decision, and obtained a suspension which reversed this decision temporarily. A final decision by the Superior Court of Sports Justice (STJD) declared Brasília as the champion.

Teams

Road to the final
Note: In all scores below, the score of the home team is given first.

Matches

First leg

Second leg

See also
2015 Copa Sudamericana

References

Copa Verde Finals
Association football penalty shoot-outs